Turraea kimbozensis is a species of plant in the family Meliaceae. It is endemic to Tanzania.  It is threatened by habitat loss.

References

Flora of Tanzania
kimbozensis
Endangered plants
Taxonomy articles created by Polbot
Taxa named by Martin Cheek